Rainieria is a genus of stilt-legged flies in the family Micropezidae. There are at least 20 described species in Rainieria.

Species
These 25 species belong to the genus Rainieria:

 Rainieria alternata Cresson, 1926 c g
 Rainieria andorum Hennig, 1935 c g
 Rainieria antennaepes (Say, 1823) i c g b
 Rainieria boliviana Hennig, 1935 c g
 Rainieria boninensis (Hennig, 1935) c g
 Rainieria brasiliana (Rondani, 1863) c g
 Rainieria brunneipes (Cresson, 1938) c g
 Rainieria calceata (Fallén, 1820) c g
 Rainieria calosoma Bigot, 1886 c g
 Rainieria gilvimana (Cresson, 1926) c g
 Rainieria hennigi Krivosheina & Krivosheina, 1996 c g
 Rainieria latifrons (Loew, 1870) c g
 Rainieria leucochira Czerny, 1932 c g
 Rainieria obscura (Hennig, 1935) c
 Rainieria paraffinis Hennig, 1935 c g
 Rainieria peruana Enderlein, 1922 c g
 Rainieria plectilis Giglio-Tos, 1893 c g
 Rainieria postica Curran, 1932 c g
 Rainieria pygmaea Hennig, 1935 c g
 Rainieria rubella (Wulp, 1897) c g
 Rainieria soccata Enderlein, 1922 c g
 Rainieria tritaeniolata Enderlein, 1922 c g
 Rainieria uda Cresson, 1930 c g
 Rainieria uniformis Hennig, 1935 c g
 Rainieria wiedemanni (Enderlein, 1922) c g

Data sources: i = ITIS, c = Catalogue of Life, g = GBIF, b = Bugguide.net

References

Further reading

External links

 
 
 

Micropezidae
Nerioidea genera
Taxa named by Camillo Rondani